Alwin Josef Wagner (born 11 August 1950 in Melsungen, Hessen) is a West German discus thrower and weight lifter, who was affiliated with University Sportclub Mainz (USC Mainz).

He finished sixth at the 1984 Summer Olympics. In Germany he is also well known for winning five national championships in a row in the years 1981-1985.

His personal best throw was 67.80 metres, achieved in July 1987 in Melsungen. This result ranks him sixth among German discus throwers, behind Jürgen Schult, Lars Riedel, Wolfgang Schmidt, Armin Lemme and Hein-Direck Neu. While competing, he was 1.96 meters tall and weighed 130 kg.

International competitions

References

1950 births
Living people
German male discus throwers
West German male discus throwers
Olympic athletes of West Germany
Athletes (track and field) at the 1984 Summer Olympics
World Athletics Championships athletes for West Germany
Sportspeople from Kassel (region)
People from Schwalm-Eder-Kreis